Pietro Giudici (21 July 1921 – 11 November 2002) was an Italian professional racing cyclist. He rode in two editions of the Tour de France.

References

External links
 

1921 births
2002 deaths
Italian male cyclists
Cyclists from the Province of Varese